Rozhdestvenskoye is a rural locality (a selo) and the administrative center of Rozhdestvenskoye Rural Settlement, Povorinsky District, Voronezh Oblast, Russia. The population was 2,645 as of 2010. There are 49 streets.

Geography 
Rozhdestvenskoye is located 8 km northwest of Povorino (the district's administrative centre) by road. Povorino is the nearest rural locality.

References 

Rural localities in Povorinsky District